Khalid Hamid (born 18 October 1962) is a field hockey player from Pakistan. He was born in Gujranwala. He won a gold medal at the 1984 Summer Olympics in Los Angeles. He joined the Pakistan National Hockey team in 1980. He played India vs Pakistan test series in 1981, Puma Trophy 1981 in Frankfurt, Peugeot Trophy 1981 in Amsterdam, 2nd Junior World Cup 1982 at Kuala Lampur, King Azlan Shah trophy 1983 at Kuala Lampur, Top 10 Nations Hockey tournament in 1983 at Hong Kong, World Champions Trophy Tournament in 1983, 1984 & 1988. He also represented Pakistan  in the 3rd Asia Cup in 1985 Dhaka, India vs Pakistan test series 1988, Seoul Olympics 1988 and many more other international events. He capped 150 times and scored 20 goals.

In recognition of his services to Pakistan in the game of hockey, he was awarded '''President Medal (صدارتی ایوارڈ تمغۂ حسنِ کارکردگی) in 1988 by Government of Pakistan. After relinquishment from his playing career he started coaching Pakistan hockey teams very actively. He also coached UAE field hockey clubs and Qatar hockey team.
Recently Pakistan Hockey Federation has appointed him selector for next four years to select the national junior and senior teams. He is working for Pakistan International Airlines in commercial department and currently posted as country manager PIA Doha (QATAR).He is now transferred back to Pakistan and posted as regional manager Pakistan  PIA Head office  Karachi.

Gallery

External links

References

1962 births
Living people
Field hockey players from Gujranwala
Pakistani male field hockey players
Olympic field hockey players of Pakistan
Field hockey players at the 1984 Summer Olympics
Field hockey players at the 1988 Summer Olympics
Olympic gold medalists for Pakistan
Olympic medalists in field hockey
Medalists at the 1984 Summer Olympics